Turbulence is a 2000 drama film directed by Ruy Guerra. A co-production between Brazil, Cuba, and Portugal, it was shot in Rio de Janeiro and Havana.

Cast
 Jorge Perugorría as I
 Bianca Byington as Sister
 Leonor Arocha as Ex-wife
 Tonico Oliveira as Brother-in-law
 Aurora Basnuevo as Indigenous woman
 Candido Damm as Crazy man
 Athayde Arcoverde as Red-haired man
 José Antônio Rodriguez as Old man
 Verónica Lynn as Mother
 Xando Graça as Sheriff
 Suzana Ribeiro as Sister's friend

Reception
It was entered into the 2000 Cannes Film Festival. It won the Best Cinematography and Best Music awards at the 2000 Gramado Film Festival. At the Viña del Mar Film Festival it won the Best Cinematography Award, while Guerra was awarded the best director at the Festival de Cine Iberoamericano de Huelva.

References

External links

2000 drama films
2000 films
Brazilian drama films
Cuban drama films
Films directed by Ruy Guerra
Films shot in Havana
Films shot in Rio de Janeiro (city)
Portuguese drama films
2000s Portuguese-language films